The 2018 Swazi Bank Cup is the 15th edition of the Swazi Bank Cup (37th edition including earlier cup competitions), the knockout football competition of Swaziland.

Round of 16
[Mar 10]

Manzini Wanderers      1-0 Vovovo                 

Royal Leopards         2-0 Tambuti                

Tambankulu Callies     2-2 Young Buffaloes        [6-7 pen]

Malanti Chiefs         5-1 Moneni Pirates         

Manzini Sundowns       1-0 Sikhalo seAfrika       

[Mar 11]

Green Mamba            1-0 Mbabane Swallows       

Zibonele Vultures      1-1 Matsapha United        [1-4 pen]

Mbabane Highlanders    3-0 Midas City

Quarterfinals
[all matches at Somhlolo National Stadium]

[Apr 7]

Malanti Chiefs         1-3 Green Mamba            

Young Buffaloes        0-1 Royal Leopards         

[Apr 8]

Manzini Wanderers      0-0 Manzini Sundowns       [aet, 9-8 pen]

Mbabane Highlanders    1-1 Matsapha United        [aet, 5-4 pen]

Semifinals
[Apr 15, King Sobhuza Stadium]

Young Buffaloes        2-2 Green Mamba            [aet, 5-3 pen]

[Apr 16, Somhlolo National Stadium]

Mbabane Highlanders    0-2 Manzini Wanderers

Final
[May 6, Somhlolo National Stadium]

Manzini Wanderers      1-2 Young Buffaloes        

[Kola Aledeonkun 5; Phiwa Dlamini 28, 85]

See also
2017–18 Swazi Premier League

References

Swaziland
Cup
Football competitions in Eswatini